In mathematics, the category of medial magmas, also known as the medial category, and denoted Med, is the category whose objects are medial magmas (that is, sets with a medial binary operation), and whose morphisms are magma homomorphisms (which are equivalent to homomorphisms in the sense of universal algebra).

The category Med has direct products, so the concept of a medial magma object (internal binary operation) makes sense. As a result, Med has all its objects as medial objects, and this characterizes it.

There is an inclusion functor from Set to Med as trivial magmas, with operations being the  right projections

 (x, y) → y.

An injective endomorphism can be extended to an automorphism of a magma extension—the colimit of the constant sequence of the endomorphism.

See also

 Eckmann–Hilton argument

Medial magmas